Edwig Van Hooydonck (born 4 August 1966 in Ekeren) is a former professional road racing cyclist from Belgium. He won the prestigious Tour of Flanders twice and Brabantse Pijl four times. Van Hooydonck retired from professional cycling because he felt he could no longer compete with other cyclists, who were at the time starting to dope themselves, without himself cheating too. At this time Erythropoietin (EPO) was becoming a widely used doping agent in the sport. He is the uncle of current professional cyclist Nathan Van Hooydonck.

One minor innovation in cycling credited to Van Hooydonk are three quarter length bibshorts. After he had aggravated a knee problem during the 1989 Tour of Flanders, he had cycling shorts made that stretched below the knee, as an alternative to bandaging the knee.

Major results

1984 
 1st  Road race, National Junior Road Championships
1985
 7th Paris–Roubaix Espoirs
1986
 1st Ronde Van Vlaanderen Beloften
 2nd Paris–Troyes
 3rd Flèche Ardennaise
 5th Overall Circuit de la Sarthe
1987
 1st Brabantse Pijl
 2nd Grand Prix Eddy Merckx
 3rd Le Samyn
 5th Overall Ronde van Nederland
1st Stage 5 (TTT) 
 5th Overall Classic Brugge–De Panne
 5th Paris–Roubaix
 5th Züri-Metzgete
 10th Grand Prix des Nations
 10th Nokere Koerse
1988
 1st  Overall Vuelta a Andalucía
1st Prologue
 1st Grand Prix Eddy Merckx
 3rd Overall Tour of Sweden
 4th Overall Tour Méditerranéen
1st Stage 3 
 4th Brabantse Pijl
 5th Overall Tirreno–Adriatico
 8th Firenze–Pistoia
 10th Rund um den Henninger Turm Frankfurt
1989
 1st Tour of Flanders
 1st Kuurne–Brussels–Kuurne
 1st Grand Prix de Denain
 2nd Grand Prix Eddy Merckx
 3rd Paris–Roubaix
 4th Druivenkoers Overijse
 5th Circuit des Frontières
 5th Rund um den Henninger Turm Frankfurt
 7th Brabantse Pijl
 8th Overall Classic Brugge–De Panne
1990
 1st Dwars door België
 2nd Road race, National Road Championships
 2nd Omloop Het Volk
 3rd Paris–Roubaix
 4th Druivenkoers Overijse
 7th Brabantse Pijl
1991
 1st Tour of Flanders
 1st Brabantse Pijl
 1st Grand Prix d'Ouverture La Marseillaise
 1st Schaal Sels
 1st Grand Prix de la Libération (TTT)
 3rd Omloop Het Volk
 3rd Grand Prix Eddy Merckx
 4th Nationale Sluitingsprijs
 5th Züri-Metzgete
 9th Overall Tour de l'Oise
 9th Liège–Bastogne–Liège
 9th Circuit des Frontières
 9th Grand Prix des Amériques
1992
 1st Grand Prix de Denain
 1st Grand Prix d'Ouverture La Marseillaise
 1st Stage 6 Vuelta a España
 1st Stage 3 (ITT) Étoile de Bessèges
 3rd Tour of Flanders
 4th Overall Tour of Ireland
1st Stage 3 
 4th Brabantse Pijl
 6th Road race, National Road Championships
 7th Grand Prix de Wallonie
 10th Liège–Bastogne–Liège
 10th Paris–Tours
1993
 1st Brabantse Pijl
 1st Stage 2 Tour de Romandie
 1st Stage 3b (ITT) Tour de Luxembourg
 2nd Overall Vuelta a Andalucía
 3rd Overall Tour de l'Oise
 3rd Overall Classic Brugge–De Panne
 3rd Nationale Sluitingsprijs
 5th Druivenkoers Overijse
 6th Paris–Roubaix
 7th Tour of Flanders
 8th Grand Prix des Nations
 10th Road race, National Road Championships
1994
 4th Road race, National Road Championships
 5th Brabantse Pijl
 8th Tour du Haut Var
 8th Grand Prix Eddy Merckx
 9th Tour of Flanders
 9th Druivenkoers Overijse
1995
 1st Brabantse Pijl
 2nd Omloop Het Volk
 2nd Binche–Chimay–Binche
 3rd Clásica de Almería
 3rd Druivenkoers Overijse
 5th Overall Vuelta a Murcia
 7th Grand Prix Eddy Merckx
1996
 2nd Brabantse Pijl
 2nd Dwars door België
 5th Omloop Het Volk
 9th Trofeo Laigueglia

References

External links
Palmarès by cyclingbase.com

Living people
Belgian male cyclists
Belgian Vuelta a España stage winners
1966 births
Cyclists from Antwerp
People from Ekeren